Malolos station is a former railway station located on the North Main Line in Bulacan, Philippines. The station was once part of the line until its discontinuation in 1988. It is currently being rebuilt as the terminus for the first phase of the North–South Commuter Railway. As part of the project, the old station will also be restored.

History
Malolos was opened on March 24, 1891. Services from Manila to Dagupan commenced on November 24, 1892. It was later abandoned after the ending of northbound services by the Philippine National Railways (PNR).

The station was to be rebuilt as a part of the Northrail project, which involved the upgrading of the existing single track to an elevated dual-track system, converting the rail gauge from narrow gauge to standard gauge, and linking Manila to Malolos in Bulacan and further on to Angeles City, Clark Special Economic Zone and Clark International Airport. The project commenced in 2007, but was repeatedly halted then discontinued in 2011.

Gallery

References

Philippine National Railways stations
Railway stations in Bulacan
Buildings and structures in Malolos